CS Film is a Czech television channel. It was founded and started to broadcast in 2004 by Czechoslovak Film Company ("Československá filmová společnost s.r.o.") and 2019 merger for Slovakia media by JOJ Group. CS Film specializes on cinematography of former Czechoslovakia (1918-1992).

Filmy

 Dita Saxová
 Lelíček ve službách Sherlocka Holmese
 Lásky jedné plavovlásky
 Boxer a smrt'
 Trhák
 Mladé vino

External links
 Official Website

Companies based in Prague

Television stations in the Czech Republic
Television channels and stations established in 2004
Czech-language television stations
Slovak-language television stations
2004 establishments in the Czech Republic
Cinema of Czechoslovakia